Admiral Sir George Parker, KCB (1767 – 24 December 1847) was a British Royal Navy officer.

He was born the son of George Parker and the nephew of Admiral Sir Peter Parker, 1st Baronet. He joined the Royal Navy in 1773 under the patronage of his uncle and served throughout the American War of Independence. His uncle then promoted him to lieutenant (at the age of 15) in 1782.

In 1786, he was posted to the 14-gun sloop HMS Wasp, before being transferred in 1788 to HMS Phoenix, a 36-gun fifth-rater, in which he sailed to the East Indies to co-operate with the army in the struggle against Tippoo Sahib. He was also involved in a bitter confrontation with the French 46-gun La Résolue. Sent home with the despatches of Commodore Cornwallis he was next posted at the commencement of the French Revolutionary Wars as First Lieutenant to the 36-gun HMS Crescent, took part in the taking of the French frigate La Réunion of 40 guns, and was rewarded in 1794 with the command of the sloop HMS Albacore and in 1795 with that of the 24-gun HMS Squirrel.

Transferred in 1796 to the 36-gun frigate HMS Santa Margarita and cruising off the coast of Ireland and later in the West Indies, he succeeded in the capture of a number of enemy vessels, including L’Adour of 16 guns, La Victorine of 16 guns, the San Francisco of 14 guns and Le Quatorze Juillet of 14 guns.

His next postings were, in 1804-05, to the 44-gun HMS Argo and the 64-gun HMS Stately in the North Sea, where, in the Stately, he was for a time employed in blockading the enemy's squadron in the Texel. After being sent, in January 1808, to the Baltic in command of three ships of the line, they were frozen up in the ice on reaching Gothenburg. Parker, however, arranged for a canal to be cut and thereby extricated his squadron and a large convoy of merchantmen bound for England. Later in the month, in company with HMS Nassau they captured the 74-gun Danish ship HDMS Prinds Christian Frederik in the Battle of Zealand Point.

After his return to England he was appointed to the 74-gun third-rater HMS Aboukir  in which (as part of the Walcheren expeditionary force) he was employed in the North Sea and the Mediterranean until the end of 1813. He then returned home and did not go to sea again.

He was promoted Rear-Admiral on 4 June 1814, Vice-Admiral on 19 July 1821 and full Admiral on 10 January 1837. His investment as a Knight Commander of the Order of the Bath (KCB) took place on 12 June 1833.

He died in 1847. He had married a daughter of Peter Butt. They had no children.

References

 

1767 births
1847 deaths
Royal Navy admirals
Royal Navy personnel of the Napoleonic Wars
Knights Commander of the Order of the Bath